The Vale of Berkeley (sometimes known as Berkeley Vale) is an area in Gloucestershire, England. It lies between the River Severn and the Cotswold Edge, north of Bristol and south of Gloucester. It includes the towns of Berkeley, Thornbury, Cam, Dursley, Wotton-under-Edge and surrounding villages.

Vale of Berkeley College was a comprehensive school at Wanswell, just north of Berkeley, which closed in 2010.

Valleys of Gloucestershire
Berkeley, Gloucestershire